Roger Chastel (Édouard Henri Roger Chastel; 25 March 1897 in Paris – 12 July 1981 in Saint-Germain-en-Laye.) was a French painter from l'École de Paris with their work inside le limit of abstract art.

See also
Ouanes Amor

References

External links
 Musée national d'art moderne Centre Georges Pompidou collection  (search: Chastel)
 Exposition temporaire 2007 at Musée Gorsline (Bourgogne): «Natures mortes et vivaces : Roger Chastel et Douglas Gorsline» 

1897 births
1981 deaths
20th-century French painters
20th-century French male artists
French male painters
Painters from Paris
19th-century French male artists